Anant Balani (1962 – 29 August 2003) was a Bollywood film director and screenwriter.

He directed films such as Patthar Ke Phool in 1991 which starred Salman Khan and Raveena Tandon in lead roles. He also wrote the script for Insaaf: The Justice, released in 2004.

He died of a heart attack on 29 August 2003 in Mumbai. 2003 had been a strenuous year for him and he had finished three films and was working on a fourth at his time of death. Three of the films that he had directed, namely, Joggers' Park, Mumbai Matinee and Ek Din 24 Ghante were released after his death.

Filmography
Gawahi (1989)
Patthar Ke Phool (1991)
Jazbaat (1994)
Joggers' Park (2003)
Mumbai Matinee (2003)
Ek Din 24 Ghante (2003)
Chameli (2004) (died during filming)

References

External links
 

1962 births
2003 deaths
Hindi-language film directors
Indian male screenwriters
Film directors from Mumbai
20th-century Indian film directors
21st-century Indian film directors
20th-century Indian screenwriters
20th-century Indian male writers